Karthik (born 7 November 1980) is an Indian playback singer and composer. Karthik started his professional singing career as a backing vocalist and has since been working as a playback singer. He has sung more than 8000 songs in 15 Indian languages including Tamil, Telugu, Malayalam, Kannada, Odia, Bengali, Marathi and Hindi.

Early and personal life 

Karthikeyan hails from Tiruvarur district. He is a trained Carnatic music vocalist. He was part of a college band and regularly participated in IIT Madras Fest Saarang. An ardent fan of A. R. Rahman, Karthik's dream was to meet Rahman and sing for him. Playback singer Srinivas, who collaborated often with Rahman was Karthik's close friend's cousin. Srinivas encouraged Karthik to look at singing as a career, which prompted Karthik to resume his singing lessons. One year later, Srinivas recommended Karthik's name to Rahman, who needed fresh voices for backing vocalists for a song from Pukar. Karthik eventually got the opportunity and recorded for the song. Having spent over a year being a backing vocalist, Karthik got his break during the Rahman's scoring of One 2 Ka 4. For the background score, A. R. Rahman wanted a high-pitched alap and he eventually chose Karthik to sing the alap. Soon after, Rahman asked him to sing the song "Nendhukittaen" from the film Star.

Karthik was a CA aspirant before he became a professional singer. He is married to Ambika, they have a daughter and a son.

Career 

Karthik has sung a number of songs for many popular music directors, including A. R. Rahman, Ilaiyaraaja, Hamsalekha, Vidyasagar, Devi Sri Prasad, Harris Jayaraj and Manisharma, in several languages – Tamil, Kannada, Telugu, Malayalam and Hindi. "Ennaku Oru Girlfriend" from the Tamil film Boys was one of the biggest hits of the year as was "Oru Maalai" (Ghajini; 2005). His songs for Telugu films for Kotha Bangaru Lokam (Nijanga Nenenaa), Happy Days (Arare Arare, Oh My Friend), "Badhulu Tochanai" (Mr.Perfect), "Manase Guvvai" (Naa Peru Shiva), "Oh Oh My Friend" (Oh My Friend), "Yedhuta nlichindhi choodu" (Vaana), "Meghama" (Journey), "Yevvaro" (Bodyguard) are very popular. His other popular songs include "Ava Enna" from the Vaaranam Aayiram (2009), the title track from Unnale Unnale, "Behka" from Ghajini.

Karthik has sung Kannada songs and has many super hit chart buster songs to his credit like Ale Ale, Anuraaga Aralo Samaya, Thangaliyalli Theli Hode, Nee Chummu Chummu Munjaaneli, Manasaithu Ninna Myaale, Sum Sumne Yaako, Hosadondu hesaridu Nanange, Kanne Koodiruvaaga, Madhumasa, Nenapidu Nenapidu, Thanthaane Thannamthaane, Baruve Odi Odi Nalidu, Raktha Sambandhagala, Saluge Saluge, Mannige Mara Bhaarave and many more.

In 2010, he sang a track "Behene De", from Hindi film Raavan, which is widely considered as the biggest song in his career. The track, which topped music charts for many continuous weeks, also received rave critical reviews. Karthik also performed the Tamil and Telugu versions of the same song, titled "Usure Poghudhey" and "Usire Poyene" respectively. He also sang "Adhigora Choodu" in the movie Mirapakaay.

The song Yayum Ngayum from the album Sandham: Symphony Meets Classical Tamil is considered as one of Karthik's career best for the way how he has brought sensuality to the 2000 year old poetry. He received wide appreciations for the theme song of 10th World Tamil Conference from the same album Sandham: Symphony Meets Classical Tamil. The album was featured in Amazon's Top#10 International Music albums in July 2020.

Composing 
He has composed music for a multi lingual Coca-Cola Advertisement (for Rajeev Menon featuring actor Vijay) and Prince Jewellery advertisements. He is the music director of Vasanthabalan's period film Aravaan and Srinivas Raga's Okkadine starring Nara Rohit and Nithya Menen in Telugu.

He has also released an album called "Music I Like". It is based on carnatic ragaas and it is a contemporary take on some well known keerthanas. The orchestration was done by the music director Sai Madhukar.  

He is the composer of the segment 'Guitar Kambi mele Nindru' directed by Gautham Vasudev Menon in the Netflix anthology movie Navarasa (2021). He has also composed music for an upcoming film "Joshua Imai Pol Kaakha".

Filmography

As composer 

 The films are listed in order that the music released, regardless of the dates the film released.
 The year next to the title of the affected films indicates the release year of the either dubbed or remade version in the named language later than the original version.
 • indicates original language release. Indicates simultaneous makes, if featuring in more languages
 ♦ indicates a remade version, the remaining ones being dubbed versions

As independent musician 
Karthik is a part of a band called Arka which is a contemporary fusion band.

Arka denotes the Sun in Sanskrit and to rightly interpret the meaning, it is the warmth and radiance of music that spreads across everyone listening. With the exclusive intention of extending a new musical outreach, few renowned artists in unison have created this band and intend to broaden the horizons of Indian fusion music.

Arka is the epicenter of an erupting musical form with core and artists like Karthik, SelvaGanesh, Gino Banks, Ravichandra Kulur, Santhosh Chandran, Mishko M'Ba, and guest artists like the legends Vikku Vinayakaram and Swaminathan.

As dubbing artist 
Dubbed and sang for the character Aladdin for its 2019 version.

Controversies 
As part of the #MeToo movement, Karthik was accused of sexual harassment in 2018 by several anonymous women. Singer Chinmayi Sripaada tweeted these allegations messaged to her by a woman who wished to remain anonymous. Karthik responded to the allegations by tweeting "I want to put it out there that I have never intentionally acted in a way that would make anybody feel uncomfortable or unsafe. If anybody felt hurt because of any of my actions in the past, please reach out to me directly. I do believe in facing the consequences of one's actions. I fully support #MeToo and if there's truth in anybody's grievance, I shall be more than willing to apologise or face legal action because I don't want to ever leave a sour taste in anyone's life".

Television

Awards 

 Filmfare Awards South

 Other Awards

References

External links 
 
 Listing of Karthik's songs in alphabetical order of albums
 Listing of Karthik's songs in alphabetical order of songs

1980 births
Indian male playback singers
Tamil playback singers
Telugu playback singers
Kannada playback singers
Living people
Singers from Chennai
Tamil singers
Filmfare Awards South winners
International Tamil Film Award winners
Telugu Indian Idol